The German destroyer Lütjens was the lead ship of her class, a modified version of the American Charles F. Adams class, built for the Bundesmarine (West German Navy) during the 1960s.

Design and description
The Charles F. Adams class was based on a stretched  hull modified to accommodate an RUR-5 ASROC Launcher and all their associated equipment. They displaced  at full load. Their crew consisted of 333 officers and enlisted men.

The ships were equipped with two geared General Electric steam turbines, each driving one propeller shaft, using steam provided by four D-V2M water-tube boilers. Unlike their half-sisters, the ships had two macks.

They were armed with two 5"/54 caliber Mark 42 gun forward, one each forward and aft of the superstructure. The ships were fitted with an eight-round ASROC launcher between the funnels. Close-range anti-submarine defense was provided by two triple sets of  Mk 32 torpedo tubes. The primary armament of the ships was the Tartar surface-to-air missile designed to defend the carrier battle group. They were fired via the single-arm Mk 13 missile launcher and the ships stowed a total of 40 missiles for the launcher.

Construction and career
Lütjens was killed when Bismarck was surrounded by overwhelming British naval force on 27 May 1941 in the North Atlantic. She was laid down at Bath Iron Works in Bath, Maine on 1 March 1966 with the hull classification symbol DDG-28. She was launched on 11 August 1967 and commissioned on 22 March 1969.

After over 30 years of service and a travelled distance of  Lütjens was decommissioned on 18 December 2003. She was the last steam-powered vessel and the last ship classified as a destroyer of the German Navy.

Notes

References

External links

 https://web.archive.org/web/20051227153145/http://www.ddg28.de/
MaritimeQuest Lütjens D-185 photo gallery

Lütjens-class destroyers
Ships built in Bath, Maine
1967 ships
Steam turbine-powered ships